The Square Set was a 1960s rock band from Cape Town South Africa, known for their songs Silence is Golden (SA number 1 Hit (1967))  "Carol Corina" (SA number 10 hit (1968)), and "That's What I Want" (international number 1 hit in Brazil, Argentina, and Portugal (1971-1972)).

The band formed in March 1966 and was called Neville Whitmill and the Humans.
Founder members Nol, Neville, Derek and Keith rehearsed daily for 6 months composing new songs and covers before contracting their first professional gig at the Clifton Hotel.

Nol Klinkhamer hailed from the Conservetoire of Music in Holland having a degree in Jazz played piano, organ and the vibraphone. Neville Whitmill a Soul singer from Cape Town had influences from Buddy Holly, Ray Charles, Ottis Redding, Marvin Gaye. Derek Marks from Cape Town enjoyed rock bass playing with influences from bands like The Beatles, Small faces, Dave Clark 5 and Keith Moffat from Cape Town also enjoy playing Rock music.  During the rehearsal stage they landed a gig at the "Stables nite Club" in Church Street Cape Town which gave them a venue to hone and perfect their craft. The venue was usually packed to capacity to hear the band.
At this time the band decided to record their music and in August 1966 met Ian Martin (recording engineer) and Lindsay du Plessis (owner) of A.V.S studios Bree Street CT. It was at this time that a name change was much needed. During a studio break the four got together to thrash out names and it was Nol Klinhamer who suggested "The Square Set".

The band combined soul vocals and jazz organ (with the Hammond organ growing in popularity at the time) with rock bass and drums. The Hammond sound can be heard on most of The Square Set songs.

The previously unreleased 'Silence Is Golden' had a makeover with Graham Beggs at the helm and was released on Gallos Continental label in or about March 1967. It reached number 4 on the Springbok radio charts in August 1967. This led to the release of the band's first full album, 'Silence Is Golden'.

'That's What I Want', a song first recorded by UK group The Marauders in 1963, was also recorded by The Ronnie Singer Sound, a Cape Town band Marks had previously worked with. The latter version was given to The Square Set to record. The song was changed to accommodate the lineup and added to the 'Silence Is Golden' album. This song was later released in South America on the Decca label and rose to number 1 in Brazil, Argentina 1971 and number 1 in Portugal in 1972.

The band went on to record a follow-up album, Loving You is Sweeter than Ever, with the original members, but then the band took a break. Nol Klinkhamer went to study jazz at Berklee college of music in California, after which Nol Klinkhamer and Neville Whitmill were joined by Johnny Boshoff and Tony Moore on Bass and drums to record Those Many Feelings in 1972, an album influenced by contemporary jazz rock musicians like Michael Colombier.

Derek has released a memoir called 'That's What I Want' on Amazon. The book encompasses the lives and times in personal detail of exactly what transpired during his time with The Square Set. The story continues from 1958 to 2018 5 decades of live and recorded performance during the SA apartheid era as well as The Mandela era. Derek on recommendation from drummer and friend Dave Evans also on the insistence of Gordon Mackay in 2013 to reform the band. A difficult decision without the original founder member each deceased. 

The reformed band went on to show success as the music never died. A resurgence in the band's popularity can be seen on YouTube with numerous videos uploaded by their worldwide fan base. The Best of The Square Set cd was remastered and released on Apple music, Spotify, Amazon.

With the advent of Derek's book, The Square Set will live on forever. 

Derek

Members 
 Nol Klinkhamer, Dutch born Jazz piano/organ, left October 1968, rejoined 1972
 Neville Whitmill, Cape Town born lead vocals, left October 1968, rejoined 1972
 Keith Moffat, Born Port Elizabeth drums on first album
 Derek Marks, bass on first two albums, Carol Carina. Left October 1968
 Mercia Love, vocals, joined November 1967
 Don Robertson, drums, left September 1967, ex Gene Rockwell and the Falcons
 Malcolm Postlethwaite, drums, joined September 1967 
 Mike Faure, sax, 1968
 Johnny Boshoff, bass, 1972
 Tony Moore, drums, 1972

Discography

Albums 
 Silence Is Golden, Continental ZB 8167, 1967
 Loving You Is Sweeter Than Ever, Gallotone GALP 1573, 1968
 That's What I Want, Continental/Sony SZB 8221, 1969
 Those Many Feelings, Gallotone SGALP 1657, 1972

Singles 
The Square Set
 "Silence Is Golden"/"It's A Man's World", Continental PD 9222, 1967; SA no. 3
 "Carol Corina"/"U", Continental PD 9284, 1967
 "Loving You Is Sweeter Than Ever"/"Georgia (On My Mind)", Continental PD 9348, 1968
 "That's What I Want"/"Come On", Jazzville SL.5, 1968

Neville Whitmill
 "Have Mercy On Me"/"Get Me Some Help", Continental PD 9773, 1971; SA no. 2
 "That's Why"/"Gone Those Days", Continental PD 9796, 1971
 "Silence Is Golden"/"One More Tear, One More Heartache", Continental 9982, 1974

Nol Klinkhamer
 "The In Crowd / Critics Choice", Smanje Manje SJM 12, 1967

References

External links
 The South African Rock Encyclopedia

Musical groups disestablished in 1974
Musical groups established in 1966
South African musical groups